Audra Keller (born November 17, 1971) is a retired American professional tennis player who competed on the WTA Tour from 1988 to 1996. In 1991, she was runner-up to Katerina Maleeva at the Virginia Slims of Indianapolis, falling 7–6, 6–2 in the finals. She achieved a career-best ranking of #77 in August 1992.

External links

1971 births
American female tennis players
Living people
Tennis people from Georgia (U.S. state)
Sportspeople from Macon, Georgia
21st-century American women